Oleksandr Volchkov (born 18 July 1985) is a Ukrainian professional footballer who plays as a defender for FC Vorkuta in the Canadian Soccer League.

Career

Europe
Volchkov began his career in 2004 in the Ukrainian Second League with FC Enerhiya Yuzhnoukrainsk, and later played with MFC Mykolaiv. In 2007, he played in the Ukrainian Amateur Football Championship with FC Bastion Chornomorsk, and won promotion to the Second League in 2008. He later played in the Ukrainian First League with Mykolaiv, PFC Nyva Vinnytsia, and FC Odessa. In 2013, he played abroad in the Moldovan National Division with FC Nistru Otaci. The following season he transferred to the Meistriliiga to play with FC Levadia Tallinn, and with Jõhvi FC Lokomotiv in 2014. He featured in the 2013–14 UEFA Europa League against CS Pandurii Târgu Jiu.

In January 2015, Volchkov joined Ararat Yerevan on trial, before later signing permanently for the club. Six months later, in June 2015, Volchkov moved to fellow Armenian Premier League side Alashkert. For the remainder of the season he returned to Moldova to play with FC Zaria Bălți. In 2016, he returned to the First League to play with FC Hirnyk-Sport Horishni Plavni, and FC Inhulets Petrove.

Canada 
He went overseas in 2017 to play in the Canadian Soccer League with FC Vorkuta. In his second season with Vorkuta he assisted in securing the CSL Championship. In 2020, he assisted in securing Vorkuta's second championship title after defeating Scarborough SC. In 2021, he assisted in securing Vorkuta's third regular season title.

Honours 
FC Levadia Tallinn
Meistriliiga: 2014
Estonian Cup: 2013–14
FC Vorkuta

 CSL Championship: 2018, 2020
 Canadian Soccer League First Division/Regular Season: 2017, 2019, 2021

References 

1985 births
Living people
FCI Levadia Tallinn players
FC Nyva Vinnytsia players
MFC Mykolaiv players
FC Bastion Illichivsk players
Ukrainian footballers
FC Alashkert players
FC Enerhiya Yuzhnoukrainsk players
FC Dnister Ovidiopol players
FC Nistru Otaci players
FC Ararat Yerevan players
CSF Bălți players
FC Hirnyk-Sport Horishni Plavni players
FC Inhulets Petrove players
FC Continentals players
Moldovan Super Liga players
Esiliiga players
Meistriliiga players
Armenian Premier League players
Canadian Soccer League (1998–present) players
FCI Levadia U21 players
Association football defenders
Ukrainian First League players
Ukrainian expatriate footballers
Ukrainian expatriate sportspeople in Canada
Expatriate soccer players in Canada
Expatriate footballers in Estonia
Ukrainian Second League players
Sportspeople from Odesa Oblast
Ukrainian expatriate sportspeople in Estonia